Maloye Matyshevo is a rural locality (a selo) in Matyshevskoye Rural Settlement, Rudnyansky District, Volgograd Oblast, Russia. The population was 42 as of 2010.

Geography 
Maloye Matyshevo is located in steppe, on the Khopyorsko-Buzulukskaya Plain, 34 km northwest of Rudnya (the district's administrative centre) by road. Matyshevo (settlement) is the nearest rural locality.

References 

Rural localities in Rudnyansky District, Volgograd Oblast